In political science, political engineering is the designing of political institutions in a society and often involves the use of paper decrees, in the form of laws, referendums, ordinances, or otherwise, to try to achieve some desired effect.

The criteria and constraints used in such design vary depending on the optimization methods used. Usually democratic political systems have not been deemed suitable as subjects of political engineering methods. Political engineering, using suboptimal methods or criteria, can sometimes yield disastrous results as in the case of attempting to engineer a previously democratic country's political landscape by such methods as, for example, a coup d'état. The Greek military junta of 1967–74 used political engineering utilizing a coup d'état to dissolve the democratic system of Greece with catastrophic results. Political engineering can also be employed to design alternative voting procedures in a democratic system.

In the social arena the counterpart of political engineering is social engineering.

References

Further reading

 Benjamin Reilly, Democracy and Diversity: Political Engineering in the Asia-Pacific, 2006.
 Democracy in Divided Societies. Electocal Engineering for Conflict Management, 2001.
 Giovanni Sartori, Comparative Constitutional Engineering, 2nd Ed. 1997.
 Andrés Tinoco, Ingeniería Política y de Gobierno, 2007.

Control (social and political)
Political science terminology